Sir Charles Edward Grey GCH (1785 – 1 June 1865) was an English judge and colonial governor.

He was a younger son of Ralph William Grey of Backworth House, Earsdon, Northumberland, and his wife, Elizabeth, daughter of Charles Brandling MP, of Gosforth House, Northumberland. Grey was educated at Eton, followed by University College, Oxford, graduating in 1806, and elected a fellow of Oriel College, Oxford in 1808. He was called to the bar in 1811, and appointed a commissioner of bankruptcy in 1817. In 1820 he was appointed a Judge in the Supreme Court of Madras and knighted, serving until his transfer to be Chief Justice on the Supreme Court of Bengal from 1825 to 1832.

In 1835, Grey was made a Privy Counsellor and awarded Knight Grand Cross of the Royal Guelphic Order (GCH) in 1836. He was the elected Member of Parliament for the constituency of Tynemouth and North Shields from 1838 to 1841.

In 1841 he was appointed Governor of Barbados and the Windward Islands (covering St Lucia, Trinidad, Tobago and St Vincent) and in 1846 was appointed Governor of Jamaica.

He retired to England in 1853. He died in Tunbridge Wells in 1865 and was buried in Kensal Green Cemetery.

In April 1821, before his departure for Madras, he married Elizabeth (1801–1850), second daughter of Revd Sir Samuel Clarke Jervoise, Bt, of Idsworth Park, Hampshire.  They had four sons and four daughters.

References

1785 births
1865 deaths
People from Backworth
People educated at Eton College
Alumni of University College, Oxford
Fellows of Oriel College, Oxford
Governors of Barbados
Governors of Jamaica
Members of the Parliament of the United Kingdom for English constituencies
Members of the Privy Council of the United Kingdom
UK MPs 1837–1841
Whig (British political party) MPs for English constituencies
Presidents of The Asiatic Society
Burials at Kensal Green Cemetery